Finsterwalde (Niederlausitz) station is a railway station in the municipality of Finsterwalde, located in the Elbe-Elster district in Brandenburg, Germany.

References

Railway stations in Brandenburg
Railway stations in Germany opened in 1871
1871 establishments in Prussia
Buildings and structures in Elbe-Elster